Babler State Park (formally, Dr. Edmund A. Babler Memorial State Park) is a state-managed public recreation area located in the northwest section of the city of Wildwood, Missouri. A large bronze statue of Dr. Babler greets park visitors. The state park's  offer opportunities for hiking, picnicking, bicycling, horseback riding, and camping. The park was added to the National Register of Historic Places in 1985.

History
The park was created in memory of Edmund A. Babler, who was born on October 11, 1874, in Appleton City, Missouri.  He graduated from Missouri Medical College, now known as Washington University Medical School, in 1898, became a general surgeon, developed a large private practice in St. Louis. The stories say that he spent the majority of his time devoting himself to charity cases and took much pride in his work for the unfortunate. His premature death at age 55 from pneumonia was a source of great sadness for his admirers and family. His funeral was one of the largest ever held in St. Louis.

Moved by the public sympathy and respect, Edmund's brother Jacob L. Babler began searching for a way to preserve his brother's memory.  Being a successful business graduate from St. Louis Law School, known today as Washington University, he had extensive investments in farm land and real estate.  On August 20, 1930, Jacob Babler and his younger brother Henry Babler gave 868 acres of land to the State of Missouri, to be named the Dr. Edmund A. Babler Memorial State park.  These were difficult and trying times in the world, and although they continued to give more land to the state between 1934 and 1936, Jacob had to seek the help of friend John J. Cochran, Congressman, in order to obtain federal aid for the state in order to develop the park.  This aid came in the form of designating two Civilian Conservation Camps (CCC) to be stationed within the park to develop the property.  With the help of Conrad Wirth, Director of the National Park System, plans were developed to establish a trust fund that would support construction, maintenance, and operations at the park.  A state bill was passed to formally accept the land and was signed by Governor Lloyd Stark on June 23, 1937.  The park was formally dedicated on October 1, 1938 at a ceremony in which Harold Ickes, Secretary of the Interior, spoke before an assembly of 3,500 guests.  This was when the statue of Dr. Babler was unveiled in its current location.

Jacob Babler continued throughout the rest of his life to support the park dedicated to his brother, and the Missouri State Park System as a whole.  He sponsored a proposal before the Constitution Convention of 1944, resulting in a fund developed to earmark $400,000 a year for 15 years to be used to acquire and develop additional land in the Missouri State Park System.  Overcoming the lull of park development during the Great Depression and World War II, some of the most popular Missouri State Parks were acquired and developed between 1946 and 1960.  Jacob L. Babler's support of the park system earned him the title of "Father of Missouri's State Parks".

Activities and amenities
The park offers several hiking trails,  paved bicycle trail,  equestrian trail, campground, and picnicking areas.

References

External links

Babler State Park Missouri Department of Natural Resources
Babler State Park Map Missouri Department of Natural Resources

 

Civilian Conservation Corps in Missouri
State parks of Missouri
Protected areas established in 1937
Protected areas of St. Louis County, Missouri
Historic districts on the National Register of Historic Places in Missouri
National Register of Historic Places in St. Louis County, Missouri
Parks on the National Register of Historic Places in Missouri
1937 establishments in Missouri
Buildings and structures in St. Louis County, Missouri